Mabinogi is a massively multiplayer online role-playing game released by Nexon, and developed by devCAT studio. The name of the game is taken from the Welsh word Mabinogi, a Welsh anthology of legend, and the settings for the game are loosely based on Welsh mythology.

The game engine features hand-painted textures stylized with edge detection outlining. The game world is developed continuously, through the release of important updates (referred to as "Generations" and "Seasons") that introduce new areas, additional features such as pets and new skills, and advancement of the storyline. The user interface is simple and designed in the likeness of Microsoft Windows' task bar.

Mabinogi was built on a hybrid Value Added Services model (which varies slightly for each game localization) that allows free play and the subscription of paid packages, purchased through the game shop. In South Korea, beginning with the Chapter 3 patch, Mabinogi changed to micro-transactions. It now allows 24-hour free play and the Item Shop only offers items and subscriptions for added options.

The game service is available in South Korea, Japan, Taiwan, Hong Kong, Mainland China, North America, Oceania, Israel.

The North American closed beta test began on January 30, 2008. The pre-open beta only available to Fileplanet users was released on March 5, 2008. The full open beta was released on March 6, 2008. The North American localization of Mabinogi was released on March 27, 2008.

During the 2007 Gstar game show in Seoul, South Korea, Nexon announced an Xbox 360 version of Mabinogi. However, in September 2009, they had announced that, even though the development was finished, the release of the console version has been indefinitely suspended after evaluations of the game through their business decisions.

Gameplay
The player is not limited by any class other than the character's race, and is free to level up any of the different skills available. The combination of skill choices, age, items, physical constitution, and other variables such as user titles, is what makes up the character. The gameplay is largely skill-based. To learn and improve skills, Ability Points (AP) are required.

There are also various social aspects, like sitting around a campfire, playing music, having a friendly chat, sharing food, as well as making use of different facial expressions to make user interaction more colorful.

There are currently three continents, Uladh, Belvast and Iria. If the player decides to start as a human, he or she will begin their game in the Uladh village of Tir Chonaill, or the Qilla Base Camp in Iria. If the player chooses to be an elf, the game begins in Iria at Filia, in the region Connous. Should the player decide to start as a Giant, they will begin their game at Vales, in the region Physis, which is located far north in the continent of Iria. As of the Generation 13 patch, a realm outside of Erinn, Avon (based on Stratford-upon-Avon), is able to be accessed by an item found in the first mainstream quest of that generation. As of Generation 15, Belvast Island was introduced (based upon the city Belfast). This island is accessible by taking a ship from the continent of Uladh.

Character creation and development
Characters are created by using Character Cards. Prior to the New Beginnings update, accounts received one character card upon creation, but will now receive six cards instead. These free cards cannot be regained unless another account is created, although more cards can be obtained ingame and through the Cash Shop. If the account is without any characters, a single free card will be given. This card can always be obtained, regardless of how many characters have previously been created.

Upon using a card, the player is taken to the character creation screen, where they can customize their character through choosing a name, appearance, and race, among other options. When a character is first created, only limited appearances are available, but additional options become available ingame using "Pons", which can be bought from the Cash Shop.

Currently there are three races: human, elf, and giant. When creating a character, one may choose an age between ten and seventeen. The character will age one year every (real) week. Different ages yield different initial stats and affect the number of stats raised when leveling up. AP (Ability Points) are also granted when aging; the younger one is, the more AP they will get when they age.

Rebirth is an important feature in Mabinogi. With Rebirth, players have the option to reset the age, gender, appearance, and level of their character. Characteristics such as physical features, age, and level that were associated with the old body can be bestowed onto the new one. All the achievements earned in the character's previous body, such as skill ranks and title, will also be carried over. Players usually rebirth as a way to gain AP and accumulate more levels for their character's total level.

Each (real world) day of the week grants players specific bonuses, such as getting a higher experience rate for certain skills, higher item creation success rate, aging, gaining AP, etc.

Combat system
In combat, predicting the enemy's skills and making use of combat skills is important. Some monsters are aggressive and will attack and pursue on sight (also called "aggroing"), while others attack in a pack or completely ignore the player. Unlike other MMOs, Mabinogis combat is arguably more tactical in nature - requiring careful analysis and timing of what skills to use and in what fashion. As opposed to the 'tank' roles portrayed in other online games, Mabinogis combat focuses on the player not being hit at all - through careful use of skills and precise timing. The overall complexity of Mabinogis combat system has made it much more difficult for training bots to be developed. Many are just designed to farm the significantly easier low-level monsters for in-game currency.

Mabinogi features a traditional melee combat approach (utilizing various swords, maces and shields), a ranged combat approach (using various weapons such as crossbows and long-bows) and a magic or alchemic approach - all of which have their own strengths and advantages at different points of the game. Mabinogis freeform skill system allows players to hybridize between any four of the combat trees at any time - the only limitation lying with the player's overall proficiency at operating the game controls and mechanics.

Dying causes loss of experience points. Before the new beginnings patch items could drop during death as well and retrieved from an NPC for gold, Items no longer drop and any items held by an NPC beforehand can still be retrieved normally. Fallen players can be revived by other players, self revive once every 3 minutes, or by the in-game NPC, Nao, if the player has bought such service. If the character has zero experience points and suffers a death penalty, negative experience points will accumulate. If the player reaches negative 100% experience, they will no longer be able to revive by themselves and must wait for another player to revive them, or use "Soul stones" purchased from the "Cash Shop" (Requires Nexon cash points, currency that can be used to buy special items that cannot be bought in-game. Nexon cash points cost real money.).

Stats
Character statistics alter the combat system by the individual qualities of a character. Statistics are split into five categories: Strength, Intelligence, Dexterity, Will, and Luck. Strength, Intelligence, and Dexterity all determine the base attack power of melee, magic, and ranged, respectively. Dexterity also determines damage balance during melee combat. Will affects how your character absorbs strong blows and how much damage is done to enemies. A character's luck rating may improve the chance of high hits, gathering, and increases the chance of lucky drops.

These statistics may be raised by ranking most skills. For example, Magic Mastery, because its dealing with magic, raises a certain amount of Intelligence per rank. The raising of Life Skills is beneficial to warriors because of Strength increases in activities such as carpentry and fishing.

Fantasy Life
There is a wide range of Life skills which give the player the chance to experience a different side of the "fantasy life". Players can perform tasks such as tending to the wheat and potato fields, making flour, gathering wool from sheep and eggs from hens, weaving and making garments, mining for minerals and crafting weapons, playing and composing music, cooking dishes, taming animals, etc.

Using a system called Music Markup Language (actually a variation of Music Macro Language, which is completely distinct from the notation format usually referred to as Music Markup Language), players may compose their own arrangements or use music scrolls created by other players. In the North American version, these are known as the "Compose" and "Play Music" skills. Different musical instruments, such as lutes, ukuleles, flutes, and others can be used to play.

NPC interaction is important. As the player talks to different non-player characters, more dialog keywords will become available. These will reveal plot points and NPC backgrounds, unlock quests or skills, etc. NPCs also offer a variety of services such as shops, item repair and upgrade, skill apprenticeships and more. Players can also request part-time jobs from some of the NPCs, which can be completed in a quest-like fashion.

There is also the creation of homesteads which allows players to have a free space to themselves where they can perform certain activities such as farming, fishing, etc. They can be customized by the building of items, such as ornaments, using homestead stones. These homesteads can be accessed once the character reaches level 10 and has completed a quest.

Quests, Exploration Quests and Part-Time Jobs
There are many different quests that players can complete throughout the game. Different types of quests exist, some are party quests, others involve monster hunting, item collecting or other tasks, for instance, skill-based quests like cooking or tailoring.

Some of them are received by the player at specific points or after certain quests are completed, others are given by the NPCs, some can be purchased as quest scrolls and, finally, there are also exploration quests that the player can enroll in through the Quest Boards found throughout Erinn.

Quest rewards may consist of experience points, Ability Points, gold, items or a combination of these rewards. Quests help the player to discover the game's regions and to find out about the many available NPCs, as they involve traveling to different parts of the game world and talking to all the different non-player characters.

Exploration quests typically involve finding certain hidden objects using a pair of L-shaped rods or by finding landmarks or animals and making a sketch of these. Different exploration quests are available according to the player's exploration level. There is also a player rank for the completion of each quest. When a character completes exploration quests or simply comes across these hidden landmarks, the character's exploration level will increase, and as they level up, the character will gain Ability Points, and access to new exploration quests.

Another type of special quests are part-time jobs, which are given by the NPCs. Part-time jobs are only available at a specific time of the day for each NPC and have a time limit to be completed. The player must complete the requested tasks (i.e.: delivering an item to another NPC, crafting a certain number of items, collecting objects, doing farming chores, etc.) and report back to the NPC to choose their reward. As the player successfully completes more jobs, NPCs will give more rewarding quests.

Repeating these jobs helps to raise the intimacy level between the player and the NPC (giving certain items to the NPC may also help). When a "friendship" has been established between them, certain merchant NPCs will reveal a secret store to the player with special items to purchase.

Mainstream plots
Mabinogi also has several mainstream story campaigns. These campaigns have connected story lines (when grouped together, are called Chapters) that reveal the background story of Erinn and several important characters. There are campaigns, such as Generations 1 through 3 (Chapter 1), 7 and 8 (Chapter 2), 9 through 12 (Chapter 3), and 13 through 16 (Chapter 4) that must be completed in sequential order, each implemented at their corresponding Generation updates.

Skills
Each character can develop a large number of skills, although some can only be learned if the character is of a certain race (Human, Elf, Giant). Skills are divided into nine categories: Life, Combat, Magic, Alchemy, Fighter, Music, Puppeteer, Dual Gunner and Ninja. Life refers to crafting and performing skills, such as fishing, cooking, composing, tailoring, blacksmithing or potion making. Some of the Life skills available are also mini-games. Combat skills refer to melee and ranged attack skills, as well as defensive moves. Magic comprises three kinds of elemental magic (ice, fire and lightning) and non-elemental magic, such as healing and recovery skills. In Generation 9, Alchemy was introduced to the game world. Alchemy is used with a cylinder and a crystal, and can be used to create temporary walls, summon golems and a number of spells resembling magic (water/ice, fire/fire, wind/lightning and clay/neutral) according to the crystal used. In Generation 16, Fighter was released, introducing martial art techniques. In The Saga: Iria, Dual Gunner was introduced, and its skills regard the use of mana bullets. From The Shadows patch introduced the Ninja talent, which is enhanced by Strength and Will.

Characters can also improve their life skills, which include Cooking, Tailoring, and First Aid. There are also music skills, including Playing Instrument and Composing. These skills can give players advantages to improve their battle experiences or can be used to improve their social experience within the game.

Skills can be improved by advancing them to higher ranks. This is done by meeting certain requirements, usually involving the use of the skill. For most skills, it is also required to spend a number of Ability Points, which are acquired by gaining levels or aging.

Time and weather
The game has its own internal clock, with thirty-six minutes of real time corresponding to one in-game day. The sun and moon move visibly across the sky with the hours, with objects casting shadows that move accordingly, and the moon undergoes phases. A second moon, always rising and setting opposite the sun, is described as the source of magic energy, and players recharge mana faster while it is in the sky.
In Erinn, the Sun is called Palala, it is said to provide energy on the world. The Red Moon is called Eweca, which generates Mana. The Blue Moon is called Ladeca.

Each real time day of the week offers players the opportunity to take advantage of specific gameplay bonuses, such as increased skill success or lowered NPC store prices and also go to the other world. Weekday names used in-game reflect the Celtic mythology that the game evokes. In Mabinogi, actual days of the week represent seasons and are named for the traditional Welsh and Irish quarter days and cross-quarter days.
Imbolic (Sunday)
Alban Eiler (Monday)
Beltane (Tuesday)
Alban Heruin (Wednesday)
Lughnasadh (Thursday)
Alban Elved (Friday)
Samhain (Saturday)

A dynamic weather system is also in place, with effects such as heavier or lighter cloud cover, rain, and thunder. The weather affects the outcomes of certain player skills and work done by NPCs.

Dungeons
Mabinogi uses an instanced dungeon system, with random map generation, that allows dungeon exploration by multiple players at the same time. When a player enters a dungeon, he will find a lobby with a statue of the goddess, and a platform before it. A separate dungeon instance is created for every unique type of item thrown on the platform (for dungeon passes, a unique instance is created for each instance of pass dropped). Depending on what the player drops, he might end up in a dungeon instance with players already in it.
 	 	
Dungeons maps consist of connecting rooms and corridors. As the player explores the map, the player will encounter chests or other devices which will, if opened or activated, summon monsters that must be defeated in order to progress in the dungeon path. At the end of each dungeon, there is a large room, which will usually have the boss enemy of the dungeon (sometimes escorted by a number of other enemies). Once the boss and its minions are defeated, a treasure room is opened, with the rewards for clearing the dungeon. The number of treasure chests inside the treasure room will be equal to the number of characters in the dungeon (at the time of dungeon creation). Players can thus explore the dungeons in teams. Some dungeons have special items called passes which allow harder (and sometimes easier) versions to be done. Some passes require a specific number of players to form the team.

After Generation 9, similar dungeons called Shadow Missions and Theatre Missions were implemented. They feature the same basic mechanics, but are selectable by the player and usually take place on a large, isolated, fixed map or area instead of using a generated map.

Titles
Achieving certain conditions (collecting items, performing tasks, etc.) will reward the character with a title. These conditions can range from participating in the closed beta to completing quests. Titles, when applied to a character, can positively or negatively change the character's stats. Titles can also be applied to pets, though they have no effect on their stats.

Some titles are unique in the server, with each server having only one character who holds that specific title.

Achievements
Players can also acquire achievements, which are recorded by an achievement journal, by doing numerous events like acquiring a title or completing a dungeon.

Destiny System
In Generation 13, a feature called "Destiny System" was implemented. Similar to a class system, but without any penalty or skill limitations, this system allows the player to optionally choose their specialized job and become either a Warrior, Ranger, Mage, Alchemist. Players have the chance to change or choose Destinies during every rebirth.

When players specialize in a Destiny, they gain a specific stat increases to that own Destiny (e.g., Warriors gain more strength than average). In addition, they gain twice the training experience they would normally gain for the said skill (e.g., being a Warrior allows you to train Smash twice as fast), and they will not be penalized in other Destiny skills (e.g., Warriors can train and use all magic skills without limitations).

Commerce System
A trading allows players to trade items throughout various towns within Erinn for Ducats, the "currency" of the Fomors. EXP and Gold are also rewarded from Commercing as well.

When Commercing, one must take consideration of the number of items being transported, the number of items the transportation method can carry, and the selling price at the target town in order to receive the maximum profit.

Ducats rewarded from Commercing are separate from the Gold currency obtained in the game. Ducats allows the player to purchase various items sold by the Mercantile Imp found at each Trading Post. Items sold by the Mercantile Imp include Fomorian-variant weapons which are stronger than normal weapons, however a special stone upgrade cannot be performed on them. Occasionally, the selection may include Legendary Weapons which may yield various effects (i.e. the Legendary Weapon, Tyrfing greatly increases the weapon's damage after rendered unconscious).

The currency may also be used to purchase transportation methods; starting from a Backpack to a Handcart to a Wagon or a Pack Elephant. The transportation modes increase the user's movement speed and weight and/or item slots, allowing them to carry more items.

Transportation of items also increases the player's Merchant Rating for that town. A higher rating offers discounts for various items, as well as allowing one purchase more valuable goods for trading with other towns.

Other game features
Players can set up stores to sell their items. Items cannot be looted since any item dropped from a monster cannot, as a rule, be picked up by another player for an amount of time proportional to an item's value. Items can be safely traded through the trading panels.

Mabinogi has a variety of in-game books. Mabinogi fetches the contents of books you read over the Web using HTTP from mabibook.nexon.net. Using a program like WireShark (with a filter like 'http contains GET') or tcpdump can capture the HTTP requests sent when you read a book in the game.

Generation 3, in later updates, added housing areas between Tir Chonaill and Dunbarton in an area splitting off of Dugald Aisle, and also between Bangor and Emain Macha in an area splitting off of Sen Mag Plateau. Through this housing system, players can bid for a house and pay rent for it afterwards, in order to keep it. Houses may be used as stores, and players are able to purchase items to decorate their homes.

Player characters can also get married in-game, by requesting this to a marriage NPC. A pet system is also available. Players may purchase Pet Cards from the game store and summon them in-game. Pets can help in combat or, in some cases, even be used as transportation, allowing the player to travel at a greater speed than on foot. Each pet has a fully customizable AI system, allowing the owner to give it preset actions he or she desires. Pets can even be played by players themselves. Like the player characters, pets also grow as they age. However, unlike player characters, pets automatically learn skills based on their level.

Other features include the guild, party, and Player vs Player systems. Guild creation requires the purchase of an extended play package from the game store. Guilds can expand/level up by meeting an increasing quota of points (called Guild Points, or GP), which are earned by the guild's members by playing in-game. Similar to other games, the party system allows sharing of experience points between players. PvP combat is possible in special arenas, as well as between Paladins and Dark Knights at any location, as well as "duels", where characters arrange combat for each other, or their pets. As of the Pioneers of Iria release, elves and giants can also engage in full PvP combat at any location, as well as those humans aligned with elves or giants.

European release
On January 27, 2010, Nexon launched the Open Beta of Mabinogi Europe with two game servers: Morrighan and Macha. Along with the Open Beta release came the generation 2 expansion. It was expected that generation 3 would be released when the game enters the official phase, which will be accompanied by the opening of the cash shop.

Nexon Europe eventually launched Mabinogi on May 26, 2010. A few months later, Nexon Europe released Generation 12 at the same time as North America in October 2010, a large update featuring new mainstream quests and skills. Shortly after this, Nexon Europe removed 2 of the 5 available game channels in Macha, due to a lack of players in that server.

In April 2012, Nexon Europe announced its plans to shut down the European service on the 25th, (due to insufficient player-base growth and profit) and allowed its former users to play on North American servers with a new account and no character transfers if they wished to do so. Nexon America has since lifted the European IP blocks for Mabinogi.

On July 13, 2012, Nexon Europe announced that it is going close the game service and customer support of Mabinogi on July 18, 2012.

Reception
, the game has over  registered users worldwide.

Franchise
A prequel game for Mabinogi called Vindictus (also known as Mabinogi Heroes in Asia) was released on January 21, 2010 by devCAT, an internal studio of Korean free-to-play game publisher Nexon. It is a free-to-play action MMORPG that takes place in the same setting used in Mabinogi, but is placed chronologically several hundred years prior to the first game during a period of war and strife. Vindictus is currently released in Korea, North America, and Europe through Nexon.

Mabinogi II:Arena, the sequel to Mabinogi Heroes, was in development but subsequently cancelled. It was noted to feature more realistic 3D models, animation and settings, according to development diaries and press releases made by the game developer devCat. The game was previewed at G-Star 2012. The preview content depicted characters, enemies, and dungeon crawling that are similar to the original Mabinogi, but focused more on instant action-based combat similar to the style of Vindictus with an emphasis of the more down-to-earth skill animations similar to that of Mabinogi. It was announced in January 2014 that Mabinogi II:Arena development was stopped.

References

External links
 Official site of Mabinogi in North America, Europe & Oceania

2004 video games
Active massively multiplayer online games
Massively multiplayer online role-playing games
Cancelled Xbox 360 games
Nexon games
Video games based on Celtic mythology
Video games scored by Kenji Ito
Video games developed in South Korea
Video games with cel-shaded animation
Windows games
Windows-only games